Droogmansia pteropus is a plant in the legume family Fabaceae, native to southern tropical Africa.

Description
Inflorescences have many flowers with bright red petals.

Distribution and habitat
Droogmansia pteropus is native to southern tropical Africa, across a region from the Democratic Republic of the Congo to Mozambique.

References

Desmodieae
Flora of South Tropical Africa
Flora of the Democratic Republic of the Congo
Flora of Tanzania
Plants described in 1895
Taxa named by John Gilbert Baker
Taxa named by Émile Auguste Joseph De Wildeman